Yasir Durant (born May 21, 1998) (pronounced: YAH-seer) is an American football offensive guard for the New Orleans Saints of the National Football League (NFL). He played college football at Missouri and signed with the Kansas City Chiefs as an undrafted free agent in 2020.

College career 
Durant played college football at Missouri. Before transferring to Missouri, Durant played college football at Arizona Western College and signed with Missouri as the third ranked junior college prospect at his position. He started 33 of the 34 games he appeared in during his time at Missouri.

Professional career

Kansas City Chiefs
Durant went undrafted in the 2020 NFL Draft, a surprise to some analysts who had him projected as a third-round draft pick. 
He signed with the Kansas City Chiefs on April 30, 2020. Durant made the Chiefs final 53-man roster on September 5.

New England Patriots
The Kansas City Chiefs traded Durant to the New England Patriots for a 2022 seventh-round pick on September 1, 2021.

On August 30, 2022, Durant was waived by the Patriots.

New Orleans Saints
On September 20, 2022, Durant signed with the practice squad of the New Orleans Saints. He was promoted to the active roster on November 19, then waived two days later and re-signed back to the practice squad. He signed a reserve/future contract on January 9, 2023.

References

External links
Kansas City Chiefs bio
Missouri Tigers bio

1998 births
Living people
Kansas City Chiefs players
Missouri Tigers football players
New England Patriots players
New Orleans Saints players
American football offensive tackles